Heliothis uncta is a species of moth of the family Noctuidae. It is found in India and Pakistan.

uncta
Moths described in 1885